Messier 29 or M29, also known as NGC 6913, is a quite small, bright open cluster of stars just south of the central bright star Gamma Cygni of a northerly zone of the sky, Cygnus. It was discovered by Charles Messier in 1764, and can be seen from Earth by using binoculars.

From the solar system's viewpoint it is well within the several degrees of a certain intermittently uniquely bright and dusty plane of the night sky – that of the arms and bulge of the Milky Way. It is at least many hundreds of light years short of the yardstick distance to the galactic center, as is between 4,000 and 7,200 light years away. A 1998 popular work gives a value within this range. The uncertainty is due to poorly known absorption of the cluster's light. Its extinction greatly is from faint surrounding nebulosity and other foreground interstellar matter of this cross-section of the spiral arms (see Orion–Cygnus Arm, which is our local arm).

According to the Sky Catalogue, M29 is included in the Cygnus OB1 association, and the radial velocity component of three-dimensional motion, by default factoring in the solar system's current trajectory, is one of approaching at 28 km/s (noted, thus, as negative). Its age is estimated at 10 million years, as its five hottest stars are all giants of spectral class B0. Kepple and his associates give the apparent brightness of the brightest star as eighth magnitude of in the mid-wavelength (and frequency) "visual" band. 

The cluster's absolute magnitude is estimated at −8.2, a luminosity of 160,000 suns. The linear diameter was estimated at only 11 light years. Its Trumpler class is III,3,p,n (as it is associated with nebulosity), although Götz gives, differently, II,3,m, and Kepple gives I,2,m,n. The Sky Catalogue lists it with 50 member stars; earlier Becvar estimated 20 members.

North of 47 degrees north, the cluster is for part or all of the day above the horizon. It can be made out in binoculars in a good sky. In telescopes, lowest powers are best. The brightest of its stars form a "stubby dipper", per Mallas. The four brightest stars form a quadrilateral, and another set a small triangle just north of the northernmost of the four. It is often known as the "cooling tower" due to its resemblance to the hyperboloid-shaped structures. A few fainter stars are around them, but the cluster appears quite isolated, especially in smaller telescopes. In photographs, many faint Milky Way background stars appear.

Messier 29 can be found quite easily as it is about 1.7 degrees south of Gamma or 37 Cygni (Sadr). Angularly close, and almost certainly nearby in space, is diffuse nebulosity.

The especially hot binary Wolf-Rayet star WR 143 (WC4+Be) (HD 195177) can be found near this cluster.

See also
 List of Messier objects

References and footnotes

External links

 Messier 29 RGB Image
 Messier 29 LRGB image – 2 hrs total exposure
 
 

Messier 029
Messier 029
029
Messier 029
Orion–Cygnus Arm
17640729